Song Lun (born January 18, 1981, in Qiqihar) is a Chinese figure skater. He is the 2005 Winter Universiade silver medalist and a two-time Chinese national medalist (silver in 2004, bronze in 2002). His highest placement at an ISU Championship was 7th, achieved at the 2005 Four Continents.

Programs

Results
GP: Grand Prix

References

External links
 

Chinese male single skaters
1981 births
Sportspeople from Qiqihar
Living people
Universiade medalists in figure skating
Universiade silver medalists for China
Competitors at the 2005 Winter Universiade
Figure skaters from Heilongjiang